Naas was a constituency represented in the Irish House of Commons to 1801. The Parliament of Ireland merged with the Parliament of Great Britain to form the Parliament of the United Kingdom on 1 January 1801. Thereafter Naas was represented by the Members for Kildare.

Members of Parliament
1559–1560 John Sherlock and Henry Draycott
1585 James Sherlock and Walter Lewes 
1613–1615 Christopher Sherlock and William Lattin 
1634–1635 Christopher Sherlock and William Archbold 
1639–1642 Christopher Sherlock (expelled for non-attendance) and Nicholas Sutton (expelled for rebellion)
1642–1649 Dr Dudley Loftus 
1661–1662 George Carr and Sir John Hoey

1689–1801

Notes

References

Constituencies of the Parliament of Ireland (pre-1801)
Historic constituencies in County Kildare
Naas
1800 disestablishments in Ireland
Constituencies disestablished in 1800